Moshir od-Dowleh, also transliterated as Moshir al-Dowleh, is the title of several Iranian politicians of the Qajar era:

Mirza Hosein Khan Moshir al-Dowleh
Mirza Nasrullah Khan Naini
Hassan Pirnia